Liam Markham is an Irish sportsperson. He plays hurling with his local club Cratloe and has been a member of the Clare senior inter-county team since 2011, making his Championship debut when coming on as a substitute against Galway on 2 July 2011.

Markham attended NUI Galway. He currently works as a Tax solicitor in Dublin.

References

1990 births
Living people
Alumni of the University of Galway
Clare inter-county hurlers
Cratloe hurlers